Altay is a masculine given name and a surname which may refer to:

Altay Sarsenuly Amanzholov (1934–2012), Kazakh Turkologist
Altay Bayındır (born 1998), Turkish footballer
Altay Mehdiyev, major general and commander of the Azerbaijani Air Forces (2009–2013)
Altay Öktem (born 1964), Turkish poet, writer, researcher and doctor
Altay Özurgancı (born 1988), Turkish basketball player
Ceyhun Altay (born 1986), Turkish basketball player
Engin Altay (born 1963), Turkish politician
Fahrettin Altay (1880–1974), Turkish general
Halife Altay (1917–2003), Kazakh author and anthropologist
Seray Altay (born 1987), Turkish volleyball player

Masculine given names